The 2018–19 Arizona Wildcats men's basketball team represented the University of Arizona during the 2018–19 NCAA Division I men's basketball season. The team was led by 10th-year head coach Sean Miller and played their home games at McKale Center in Tucson, Arizona as members of the Pac-12 Conference. They finished the season 17–15, 8–10 in Pac-12 play to finish in three-way tie for 6th place. They received the 9-seed in the 2019 Pac-12 tournament, where they lost to 8-seed USC in the first round, 65–78.

Previous season

Entering the 2017–18 season, federal prosecutors in New York announced charges of fraud and corruption against 10 people involved in college basketball, including Arizona assistant coach Emmanuel "Book" Richardson. The charges allege that Richardson and others allegedly received payments from financial advisers and others to influence student-athletes to retain their services and in turn used those payments to secure recruits. Following the news, Richardson was suspended and relieved of all duties. On January 11, 2018, UA fired assistant basketball coach Book Richardson after his appeal failed.

On February 23, 2018, according to a published report by ESPN, an FBI wiretap revealed that head coach Sean Miller talked with Christian Dawkins (another key figure in the scandal) to discuss paying their top prospect, Deandre Ayton, $100,000 to commit to Arizona, with the monetary situation being dealt with directly with him. While Miller would not coach their next game that day against Oregon, Arizona allowed Ayton to play. Coach Sean Miller subsequently denied the allegation and the University of Arizona announced he will remain the coach of Arizona Wildcats men’s basketball team, with Ayton also allowed to continue playing with the team for the rest of the season. However, as a consequence of the report involving Ayton, both of Arizona's remaining committed recruits from the class of 2018, Shareef O'Neal and Brandon Williams, announced they had decommitted.

During the season, Arizona defeated Texas A&M in the Valley of the Sun Shootout in Phoenix, AZ. Arizona also defeated the same UMBC team that would go on to a historic upset of top-ranked Virginia in the NCAA tournament. Arizona lost to NC State, SMU and Purdue in the Battle 4 Atlantis in The Bahamas.

They finished the season 27–8, 14–4 in Pac-12 play to finish in a first place. The championship marked the school's 16th Pac-12 regular season championship title (back to back, 29th overall). As the No. 1 seed in the Pac-12 tournament, Arizona defeated Colorado, UCLA (avenged from 82–74 loss on February 4 in Tucson, AZ) and USC to win the 2nd straight Pac-12 tournament championship title for the 7th time. As a result, the Wildcats received the conference's automatic bid to the NCAA tournament for the sixth consecutive year (35th NCAA tournament appearances). As a No. 4 seed in the South region, in the First round, they lost to No. 13 seed Buffalo 68–89.

Offseason

2018 recruiting class
Brandon Williams, originally from Los Angeles, CA was the first commitment in the Arizona class. He committed to Arizona on June 6, 2017, over Gonzaga, Kansas, UCLA and USC. He was a consensus four-star prospect. He backed out of his commitment to Arizona after more information relating to the 2017–18 NCAA Division I men's basketball corruption scandal came out (similar to former Arizona commit Shareef O'Neal), but he ultimately decided to stay with Arizona on May 5, 2018.

2019 recruiting class
Nico Mannion, originally from Siena, Italy, was originally a part of the 2020 recruiting class, but reclassified to the 2019 class in July 2018. He verbally committed to Arizona on September 14, 2018, over Marquette. Mannion is a consensus five-star prospect out of Pinnacle HS in Phoenix, Arizona.

Christian Koloko, originally from Doula, Cameroon, was the second commitment in the Arizona class. He committed to Arizona on September 23, 2018, over California, Creighton, and Vanderbilt. He is a consensus three-star prospect out of Sierra Canyon School in Chatsworth, California.

Josh Green, originally from Sydney, New South Wales, Australia was the third commitment in the Arizona’s 2019 recruiting class. He verbally committed to Arizona on October 4, 2018, over Kansas, North Carolina, Villanova, USC and UNLV. Green is a consensus five-star prospect out of IMG Academy in Bradenton, Florida.

Zeke Nnaji, originally from Lakeville, MN was the fifth commitment in the Arizona’s 2019 recruiting class. He verbally committed to Arizona on November 23, 2018, over UCLA, North Carolina, Kansas and Purdue. Nnaji is a consensus four-star prospect out of Hopkins High School in Minnetonka, Minnesota.

Roster/Personnel

Roster

Oct. 16, 2018 - Freshman Omar Thielemans elected to leave program.
Jan. 14, 2019 - Sophomore Emmanuel Akot quit the team; to transfer after the Spring semester.
Feb 1, 2019 - Freshman Brandon Williams out indefinitely with a right knee injury. Returned on February 24 against Stanford after missing six games.

Depth chart

Coaching staff

Preseason

Red and Blue game 
The annual Red-Blue game will take place at McKale Center on October 14, 2018. After sophomore Brandon Randolph defended his crown in the dunk contest, the Red team, led by Ira Lee, knocked off the Blue team, 39-33.

Preseason rankings 
The Arizona Wildcats were selected fourth in the 2018-19 Pac-12 media poll.  
On October 22, Arizona began the season unranked receiving 14 votes in the AP poll.  It was the first time since the 2010–11, began the season not in the AP Poll.

Schedule and results
The Wildcats opponents were finalized in the summer and dates and times will be finalized in the fall. Current confirmed opponents are exhibition games against Division II school Chaminade, Baylor, Cal Poly, Houston Baptist, Montana, Georgia Southern, UC Davis, UTEP and Utah Valley. They will also participate in the 2018 Maui Invitational Tournament with three of the following potential opponents including (Auburn, Duke, Gonzaga, Illinois, Iowa State, San Diego, or Xavier). Arizona has two true away games with Alabama at Coleman Coliseum, and UConn at the XL Center. 
In the unbalanced 18-game Pac-12 schedule, Arizona will not play the two Washington schools on the road (Washington and Washington State) and two Los Angeles schools at home (UCLA and USC).

|-
!colspan=12 style=| Exhibition

|-
!colspan=12 style=| Non-conference regular season

|-
!colspan=12 style=|  Pac-12 regular season

|-
!colspan=12 style=| Pac-12 Tournament

Rankings

*AP does not release post-NCAA Tournament rankings

Player statistics

Honors

See also
2018–19 Arizona Wildcats women's basketball team

References

2018-19
2018–19 Pac-12 Conference men's basketball season
2018 in sports in Arizona
2019 in sports in Arizona